Itzik Cohen (born 22 April 1983) is an Israeli international footballer who plays for Hapoel Kfar Saba, as a central defender.

Career
Cohen has played for Maccabi Haifa, Hapoel Haifa, Hapoel Ironi Acre, Hapoel Ironi Kiryat Shmona, Hakoah Amidar Ramat Gan, Hapoel Petah Tikva, Bnei Sakhnin and Hapoel Kfar Saba.

He made his international debut in 2011.

References

1983 births
Living people
Israeli footballers
Israel international footballers
Maccabi Haifa F.C. players
Hapoel Haifa F.C. players
Hapoel Acre F.C. players
Hapoel Ironi Kiryat Shmona F.C. players
Hakoah Maccabi Amidar Ramat Gan F.C. players
Hapoel Petah Tikva F.C. players
Bnei Sakhnin F.C. players
Hapoel Kfar Saba F.C. players
Association football defenders
Israeli Premier League players
Liga Leumit players
Footballers from Acre, Israel